This is a list of rural localities in Voronezh Oblast. Voronezh Oblast is a federal subject of Russia (an oblast). Its administrative center is the city of Voronezh. Its population was 2,335,380 as of the 2010 Census.

Anninsky District 
Rural localities in Anninsky District:

 Alexandrovka
 Arkhangelskoye
 Artyushkino
 Beryozovka
 Bobyakovo
 Bolshaya Alexeyevka
 Bolshye Yasyrki
 Brodovoye
 Denisovka
 Deryabkino
 Dubrovka
 Gusevka 2nd
 Gusevka
 Khleborodnoye
 Krasny Log
 Krasny
 Kruglovsky
 Levashovka
 Mokhovoye
 Mosolovka
 Nashchyokino
 Nikolayevka
 Nikolskoye
 Novaya Zhizn
 Novonadezhdinsky
 Novy Kurlak
 Ostrovki
 Petrovka
 Posyolok Komsomolskogo otdeleniya sovkhoza Krasnoye Znamya
 Posyolok Oktyabrskogo otdeleniya sovkhoza Pugachyovsky
 Posyolok Pervomayskogo otdeleniya sovkhoza Pugachyovsky
 Posyolok otdeleniya 2-ya Pyatiletka sovkhoza Krasnoye Znamya
 Progress
 Ramonye
 Rubashevka
 Saburovka
 Sadovoye
 Sergeyevka
 Staraya Chigla
 Staraya Toyda
 Stary Kurlak
 Surovsky
 Tsentralnaya Usadba sovkhoza Pugachyovsky
 Vasilyevka
 Verkhnyaya Toyda
 Zagirshchino
 Zhelannoye

Bobrovsky District 
Rural localities in Bobrovsky District:

 2nd Nikolskoe
 Annovka
 Chesmenka
 Duginka
 Karandeyevka
 Khrenishche
 Khrenovoye
 Kopanya
 Korshevo
 Krasny
 Lipovka
 Lushnikovka
 Mechyotka
 Mitrofanovka
 Neskuchny
 Nezhdanovka
 Nikolo-Varvarinka
 Novy Buravl
 Pchelinovka
 Peskovatka
 Petrovo-Borkovsky
 Pogromok
 Razdolny
 Semyono-Alexandrovka
 Shestakovo
 Shestikurganny
 Shishovka
 Shkarin
 Sloboda
 Sokolovsky
 Sukhaya Beryozovka
 Troynya
 Verkhny Ikorets
 Yasenki
 Yudanovka
 Zarechny

Bogucharsky District 
Rural localities in Bogucharsky District:

 Batovka
 Belaya Gorka 1-ya
 Dantsevka
 Dubovikovo
 Dubrava
 Dyachenkovo
 Dyadin
 Filonovo
 Galiyevka
 Karazeyevo
 Krasnodar
 Krasnogorovka
 Kravtsovo
 Krinitsa
 Kupyanka
 Lebedinka
 Lipchanka
 Lofitskoye
 Lugovoye
 Medovo
 Monastyrshchina
 Novonikolsk
 Pereshchepnoye
 Plesnovka
 Podkolodnovka
 Poltavka
 Popovka
 Radchenskoye
 Raskovka
 Shurinovka
 Starotolucheyevo
 Sukhoy Donets
 Svoboda
 Tereshkovo
 Travkino
 Tverdokhlebovka
 Varvarovka
 Vervekovka
 Vishnyovy
 Yuzhny
 Zaliman
 Zhuravka

Buturlinovsky District 
Rural localities in Buturlinovsky District:

 Chernavka
 Chulok
 Dmitriyevka
 Filippenkovo
 Gvazda
 Karaychevka
 Klyopovka
 Kolodeyevka
 Kozlovka
 Kucheryayevka
 Makogonovo
 Maly Kislyay
 Masychevo
 Otradnoye
 Ozerki
 Patokino
 Piramidy
 Puzevo
 Serikovo
 Tolucheyevo
 Tyunikovo
 Udarnik
 Vasilyevka
 Velikoarkhangelskoye
 Verhnie Ozerki
 Yelizavetino
 Zelyony Gay
 Zelyony

Ertilsky District 
Rural localities in Ertilsky District:

 Alexandrovka
 Begichevo
 Bityug-Matryonovka
 Bolshaya Dobrinka
 Bolshoy Samovets
 Borshchyovskiye Peski
 Buravtsovka
 Chapayevskoye
 Dmitriyevka
 Dzerzhinsky
 Gnilusha
 Golevka
 Gorokhovka
 Gryaztsy
 Kolodeyevka
 Komsomolskoye
 Kopyl
 Krasnoarmeysky
 MTF Voskhod
 Malorechensky 2-y
 Malye Yasyrki
 Maryevka
 Michurinsky
 Morozovka
 Nikolsky
 Novogeorgiyevka
 Oktyabrsky
 Pervo-Ertil
 Pervomaysky
 Privolny
 Rostoshi
 Semyonovsky
 Sergeyevka
 Shchuchinskiye Peski
 Shchuchye
 Shuravka
 Slastyonka
 Sosnovka
 Stary Ertil
 Studyonovka
 Vasilyevka
 Veselovka
 Voznesenovka
 Vozrozhdeniye
 Vvedenka
 Vyazkovka
 Yacheyka

Kalacheyevsky District 
Rural localities in Kalacheyevsky District:

 Garankin
 Grinyov
 Ilyinka
 Kalacheyevsky
 Manino
 Medvezhye
 Morozov
 Morozovka
 Nikolenkov
 Novaya Kriusha
 Novomelovatka
 Perevolochnoye
 Semyonovka
 Sovetskoye
 Zalesny

Kamensky District 
Rural localities in Kamensky District:

 Atamanovka
 Dalneye Stoyanovo
 Degtyarnoye
 Goykalovo
 Ivchenkovo
 Karpenkovo
 Kirichenkovo
 Kozki
 Krutets
 Lyapino
 Marki
 Mikhnovo
 Novikovsky
 Rybalchino
 Timiryazevo
 Verkhniye Marki
 Volchanskoye
 Yevdakovo

Kantemirovsky District 
Rural localities in Kantemirovsky District:

 Bondarevo
 Kasyanovka
 Kazimirovka
 Koleshchatovka
 Kolesnikovka
 Kovalenkovsky
 Kulikovka
 Kuznetsovsky
 Mikhaylovka
 Novobelaya
 Pisarevka
 Shevchenkovo
 Volokonovka
 Yevdokiyevka
 Zaytsevka
 Zhuravka

Kashirsky District 
Rural localities in Kashirsky District:

 40 let Oktyabrya
 Biryuchenskoye
 Boyevo
 Dankovo
 Kamenno-Verkhovka
 Karamyshevo
 Kashirskoye
 Kolomenskoye
 Kommuna
 Kondrashkino
 Krugloye
 Levaya Rossosh
 Mosalskoye
 Mozhayskoye
 Posyolok Ilyicha
 Posyolok imeni Dzerzhinskogo
 Verkhneye Maryino
 Zaprudskoye

Khokholsky District 
Rural localities in Khokholsky District:

 Arkhangelskoye
 Borshchyovo
 Dmitriyevka
 Gremyachye
 Ivanovka
 Khokhol
 Kochetovka
 Kostyonki
 Nikolskoye-na-Yemanche
 Novogremyachenskoye
 Orlovka
 Oskino
 Pashenkovo
 Petino
 Posyolok Opytnoy Stantsii VNIIK
 Rudkino
 Semidesyatnoye
 Staronikolskoye
 Ustye
 Verkhnenikolskoye
 Yablochnoye
 Yemancha 1-ya

Liskinsky District 
Rural localities in Liskinsky District:

 Bodeyevka
 Divnogorye
 Dmitriyevka
 Dobrino
 Drakino
 Fyodorovsky
 Kolomytsevo
 Kolybelka
 Kopanishche
 Kovalyovo
 Liski
 Liskinskoye
 Lugovoy
 Mashkino
 Maslovka
 Melakhino
 Nikolayevka
 Nikolsky
 Nizhnemaryino
 Nizhny Ikorets
 Novozadonsky
 Pochepskoye
 Posyolok sovkhoza 2-ya Pyatiletka
 Priyar
 Shchyuchye
 Sredny Ikorets
 Strelka
 Troitskoye
 Vladimirovka
 Voznesenovka
 Vysokoye
 Yekaterinovka
 Yermolovka
 Zaluzhnoye

Nizhnedevitsky District 
Rural localities in Nizhnedevitsky District:

 Andreyevka
 Dmitriyevsky
 Glazovo
 Kuchugury
 Kurbatovo
 Lebyazhye
 Log
 Mikhnyovo
 Nizhnedevitsk
 Nizhnedevitsk
 Nizhneye Turovo
 Novaya Olshanka
 Verkhneye Turovo
 Vyaznovatovka

Novousmansky District 
Rural localities in Novousmansky District:

 1st otdeleniya sovkhoza 'Maslovskiy'
 1st otdeleniya sovkhoza 'Novousmanskiy'
 2nd otdeleniya sovkhoza 'Maslovskiy'
 Alexandrovka
 Alfyorovka
 Andreyevka
 Babyakovo
 Beryozovka
 Bolshevik
 Borozdinovsky
 Burlyayevka
 Dimitrovsky
 Dolginka
 Dolinovsky
 Druzhelyubiye
 Gorenskiye Vyselki
 Gorki
 Kamenka-Sadovka
 Karachanovsky
 Kazanskaya Khava
 Khrenovoye
 Krasnoye
 Krylovka
 Lekarstvenny
 Leninsky
 Lepyokhinka
 Makarye
 Maklok
 Mikhaylovka
 Mikhaylovsky
 Moskovsky 2-y
 Nechayevka
 Nekrylovo
 Nekrylovsky
 Nizhnyaya Katukhovka
 Novaya Usman
 Novopokrovsky
 Otradnoye
 Ozyorny
 Parusnoye
 Pionersky
 Podkletnoye
 Polovtsevo
 Pykhovka
 Rozhdestvenskaya Khava
 Rusanovo
 Sadovy
 Shevlyaginsky
 Shuberskoye
 Sokolovsky
 Studyony
 Timiryazevo
 Trudolyubovka
 Trudovoye
 Ushanovka
 Varvarino
 Volya
 Yarki
 Zamelnichny

Olkhovatsky District 
Rural localities in Olkhovatsky District:

 Adrianovka
 Bolshiye Bazy
 Bugayevka
 Drozdovo
 Gvozdovka
 Karayashnik
 Kilishovka
 Kolesnikovo
 Kopanaya 1-ya
 Kopanaya 2-ya
 Kostovo
 Kravtsovka
 Kryukov
 Limarev
 Malye Bazy
 Marchenkovka
 Maryevka
 Nazarovka
 Nerovnovka
 Novaya Sotnya
 Novodmitriyevka
 Novokarayashnik
 Novokharkovka
 Novokulishovka
 Pervomayskoye
 Peschany
 Politotdelskoye
 Postoyaly
 Posyolok imeni Lenina
 Rakovka
 Remezovo
 Rodina Geroya
 Rybny
 Salovka
 Vysoky
 Yurasovka
 Zabolotovka
 Zagiryanka

Ostrogozhsky District 
Rural localities in Ostrogozhsky District:

 Alexandrovka
 Beryozovo
 Blizhneye Stoyanovo
 Blizhnyaya Polubyanka
 Boldyrevka
 Buzenki
 Dalnyaya Polubyanka
 Devitsa
 Dolzhik
 Dubovoy
 Elevatorny
 Gniloye
 Grushevaya Polyana
 Khokhol-Trostyanka
 Kolovatovka
 Korotoyak
 Krivaya Polyana
 Luki
 Mastyugino
 Nizhny Olshan
 Novaya Melnitsa
 Novaya Osinovka
 Novo-Uspenka
 Palenin
 Peski-Kharkovskiye
 Petrenkovo
 Petropavlovka
 Pokrovka
 Rastykaylovka
 Russkaya Trostyanka
 Rybnoye
 Shinkin
 Shubnoye
 Sibirsky
 Soldatskoye
 Sredne-Voskresenskoye
 Storozhevoye 1-ye
 Ternovoye
 Trud
 Uryv-Pokrovka
 Uspenskoye
 Veretye
 Verkhny Olshan
 Vladimirovka
 Voloshino
 Yablochny
 Yezdochnoye
 Zasosna
 Zavershye

Paninsky District 
Rural localities in Paninsky District:

 Alexandrovka
 Aloye Pole
 Bogoroditskoye
 Bolshiye Yasyrki
 Bolshoye Martyn
 Borshchyovo
 Chernavka
 Dmitriyevka
 Georgiyevka
 Ivanovka 1-ya
 Ivanovka
 Kalininsky
 Kalmychyok
 Kazinovka
 Khitrovka
 Kirovskoye
 Krasnoye
 Krasny Liman
 Krasny Liman 2-y
 Krasnye Kholmy
 Kriusha
 Maryevka
 Maysky
 Michurinsky
 Mikhaylovka 1-ya
 Mikhaylovka 2-ya
 Mikhaylovsky
 Mirovka
 Nikolskoye 1-ye
 Nikolskoye
 Novoalexandrovka
 Novokhrenovoye
 Oktyabrsky
 Otrada
 Pady
 Partizan
 Perelyoshino
 Pervomaysky
 Petrovskoye
 Rostashevka
 Sergeyevka
 Shcherbachyovka
 Sofyinka
 Tarasovka
 Timiryazevsky
 Toyda
 Toyda 1-ya
 Toyda 2-ya
 Toydensky
 Usmanskiye Vyselki
 Verkhnyaya Katukhovka

Petropavlovsky District 
Rural localities in Petropavlovsky District:

 Bereznyagi
 Bychok
 Chervono-Chekhursky
 Dedovka
 Dedovochka
 Fomenkovo
 Glubokoye
 Indychy
 Kotovka
 Krasnoflotskoye
 Krasnosyolovka
 Novobogoroditskoye
 Novotroitskoye
 Novy Liman
 Ogarev
 Peski
 Petropavlovka
 Posyolok sovkhoza Trud
 Progoreloye
 Staraya Kriusha
 Staraya Melovaya
 Zamostye

Povorinsky District 
Rural localities in Povorinsky District:

 Andreyevka
 Baychurovo
 Belogorye
 Beryozovo
 Bolshaya Dmitrovka
 Bolshaya Khvoshchevatka
 Bolshoy Skororyb
 Dankovsky
 Dolzhik
 Galsky
 Goncharovka
 Grishevka
 Ilmen
 Kamenka
 Kardailovka
 Kolodezhnoye
 Korenshchina
 Kosharnoye
 Kostomarovo
 Kostyukovka
 Krasny Voskhod
 Krasyukovsky
 Kuleshovka
 Kurennoye
 Lugovoy
 Lykovo
 Malaya Sudyovka
 Mazurka
 Mokhovoye
 Morozovka
 Nikolsky
 Okrayushkin
 Oktyabrskoye
 Oktyabrsky
 Opyt
 Perevalnoye
 Peski
 Petropavlovka
 Pobedinshchina
 Podgornoye
 Pogorelovka
 Pokrovka
 Probuzhdeniye
 Rozhdestvenskoye
 Saguny
 Saguny
 Samodurovka
 Samoylenko
 Saprino
 Semeyka
 Sergeyevka
 Serpanki
 Stepanovka
 Sud-Nikolayevka
 Sukhaya Rossosh
 Ternovoye
 Varvarovka
 Verkhny Karabut
 Vikhlyayevka
 Vitebsk
 Yudino

Ramonsky District 
Rural localities in Ramonsky District:

 Aydarovo
 Beryozovo
 Bogdanovo
 Bolshaya Treshchevka
 Bolshaya Vereyka
 Chertovitsy
 Chistaya Polyana
 Glushitsy
 Gorozhanka
 Gremyachye
 Gvozdyovka
 Ivnitsy
 Karachun
 Khvoshchevatka
 Knyazevo
 Komsomolsky
 Krasnoye
 Krivoborye
 Lebyazhye
 Lomovo
 Lopatki
 Medovka
 Mokhovatka
 Nelzha
 Nizhnyaya Vereyka
 Novopodkletnoye
 Novozhivotinnoye
 Olkhovatka
 Pchelniki
 Petrovskoye
 Russkaya Gvozdyovka
 Sennoye
 Sergeyevskoye
 Sklyayevo
 Solntse-Dubrava
 Somovo
 Starozhivotinnoye
 Stupino
 Treshchevka
 VNIISS
 Yamnoye

Repyovsky District 
Rural localities in Repyovsky District:

 Butyrki
 Drakino
 Fabritskoye
 Kolbino
 Korneyevka
 Krasnolipye
 Krestyansky
 Novosoldatka
 Odintsovka
 Platava
 Prilepy
 Priluzhny
 Repyovka
 Rossosh
 Rossoshki
 Sasovka 1-ya
 Sasovka 2-ya
 Serdyuki
 Skoritskoye
 Ust-Muravlyanka

Rossoshansky District 
Rural localities in Rossoshansky District:

 Alexandrovka
 Aleynikovo
 Antselovich
 Arkhangelsk
 Arkhipovka
 Artyomovo
 Atamanovka
 Chagari
 Chernyshovka
 Golubaya Krinitsa
 Grigoryevka
 Ivanovka
 Khersonsky
 Kokarevka
 Kolbinka
 Komarovo
 Kopanki
 Kopyonkina
 Krinichnoye
 Krivonosovo
 Kulakovka
 Lebed-Sergeyevka
 Lizinovka
 Loshchina
 Malaya Mezhenka
 Molodyozhny
 Morozovka
 Nachalo
 Nagornoye
 Nikonorovka
 Nizhny Karabut
 Novaya Kalitva
 Novopostoyalovka
 Novosyolovka
 Opytnoy plodovo-yagodnoy stantsii
 Pereshchepnoye
 Pervomayskoye
 Poddubnoye
 Podgornoye
 Popovka
 Posyolok sovkhoza Rossoshansky
 Raynovskoye
 Shekalovka
 Shramovka
 Slavyanka
 Staraya Kalitva
 Stefanidovka
 Stetsenkovo
 Ternovka
 Tsapkovo
 Ukrainsky
 Verkhny Kiev
 Voroshilovsky
 Yekaterinovka
 Yelenovka
 Yevstratovka

Semiluksky District 
Rural localities in Semiluksky District:

 Bystrik
 Dalneye Lyapino
 Devitsa
 Dolgo-Makhovatka
 Gnilusha
 Golovishche
 Goslesopitomnika
 Gubaryovo
 Izbishche
 Kamenka
 Kaverye
 Kondrashyovka
 Losevo
 Malaya Pokrovka
 Malaya Vereyka
 Melovatka
 Nizhnyaya Veduga
 Novosilskoye
 Perlyovka
 Posyolok sovkhoza Razdolye
 Privolye
 Razdolye
 Semiluki
 Serebryanka
 Stadnitsa
 Staraya Olshanka
 Staraya Veduga
 Ternovoye
 Voznesenka
 Yendovishche
 Zatsepnoye
 Zemlyansk

Talovsky District 
Rural localities in Talovsky District:

 Abramovka
 Abramovka
 Alexandrovka
 Anokhinka
 Biryuch
 Dokuchayevsky
 Ilyinka
 Kazanka
 Khleborob
 Khorolsky
 Komintern
 Komsomolsky
 Kozlovsky
 Krasny
 Kupalny
 Leningradsky
 Manidinsky
 Mikhinsky
 Nikolskoye
 Nizhnyaya Kamenka
 Novaya Chigla
 Novenky
 Novitchenko
 Novogolsky 2-y
 Novogradsky
 Novonikolsky
 Novotroitsky
 Novy mir
 Orlovka
 Osinki
 Pervomaysky
 Porokhovo
 Posyolok 1-go uchastka instituta imeni Dokuchayeva
 Posyolok 2-go uchastka instituta imeni Dokuchayeva
 Posyolok 3-go uchastka instituta imeni Dokuchayeva
 Sergiyevsky
 Sinyavka
 Solontsovka
 Terekhovo
 Troitsky
 Tsentralny
 Uchastok №12
 Uchastok №26
 Uchastok №28
 Uchastok №4
 Uspensky
 Utinovka
 Vasilyevsky
 Verkhneozyorsky
 Veryovkin 1-y
 Veryovkin 2-y
 Vidny
 Voznesenovka
 Voznesensky
 Vyazovka
 Vysoky
 Zarechensky
 Znamenka

Ternovsky District 
Rural localities in Ternovsky District:

 Aleshki
 Alexandrovka
 Babino
 Bratki
 Chubrovka
 Dolina
 Dubrovka
 Kiselnoye
 Korshunovka
 Kostino-Otdelets
 Lipyagi
 Lunacharovka
 Narodnoye
 Nikitskaya
 Nikolayevka
 Novokirsanovka
 Novotroitskoye
 Orlovka
 Platonovka
 Polyana
 Popovka
 Rusanovo
 Rzhavets
 Savalskogo lesnichestva
 Semigorovka
 Sergeyevka
 Tambovka
 Ternovka
 Yesipovo
 Zarechye

Verkhnekhavsky District 
Rural localities in Verkhnekhavsky District:

 Abramovka
 Alexandrovka
 Andreyevka 1-ya
 Belovka
 Bogoslovka
 Bolshaya Privalovka
 Dmitro-Pokrovskoye
 Grushino
 Malaya Privalovka
 Malinovka
 Maly Samovets
 Mitrofanovka
 NIIOKH
 Nikolskoye
 Nikonovo
 Nizhnyaya Baygora
 Nizhnyaya Maza
 Parizhskaya Kommuna
 Perovka
 Plyasovatka
 Podlesny
 Pokrovka
 Pravaya Khava
 Semyonovka
 Shukayevka
 Sukhiye Gai
 Talovaya
 Uglyanets
 Vasilyevka 1-ya
 Verkhnyaya Baygora
 Verkhnyaya Khava
 Verkhnyaya Lugovatka
 Verkhnyaya Maza
 Verkhnyaya Plavitsa
 Vishnevka
 Volya
 Zheldayevka

Verkhnemamonsky District 
Rural localities in Verkhnemamonsky District:

 Derezovka
 Gorokhovka
 Lozovoye
 Mamonovka
 Nizhny Mamon
 Olkhovatka
 Orobinsky
 Osetrovka
 Prirechoye
 Russkaya Zhuravka
 Verkhny Mamon

Vorobyovsky District 
Rural localities in Vorobyovsky District:

 Alexeyevka
 Bannoye
 Beryozovka
 Bolshiye Alabukhi
 Dmitriyevka
 Goryushkin
 Grinyov
 Kalinovo
 Kamenka
 Kirsanovka
 Krasnopolye
 Krasnorechenka
 Krasovka
 Kutki
 Kvashino
 Lavrovka
 Leshchanoye
 Listopadovka
 Malaya Gribanovka
 Malye Alabukhi 1-ye
 Malye Alabukhi 2-ye
 Mirny
 Muzhichye
 Nagolny
 Nikolskoye 1-ye
 Nikolskoye 2-ye
 Nizhny Byk
 Nizhny Karachan
 Novogolskoye
 Novogolyelan
 Novotolucheyevo
 Pervomaysky
 Posyolok sovkhoza Pavlovka
 Solontsy
 Sredny Karachan
 Vasilyevka
 Verkhnetolucheyevo
 Verkhny Byk
 Verkhny Karachan
 Vlasovka
 Vorobyovka
 Vysokoye
 Yelizavetovka
 Zaton

See also 
 
 Lists of rural localities in Russia

References 

Voronezh Oblast